Parliamentary elections were held in Cameroon on 18 May 1973, the first since the promulgation of the country's new constitution approved in a referendum the previous year. The country was a one-party state at the time, with the Cameroonian National Union as the sole legal party. 2,600 candidates ran for a place on the CNU list, with 120 eventually winning a place on it, equal to the number seats available in the enlarged National Assembly, winning all of them with a 98.4% turnout.

Results

References

Cameroon
1973 in Cameroon
Elections in Cameroon
One-party elections
Single-candidate elections
May 1973 events in Africa